The 2003 Maui Invitational Tournament was an early-season college basketball tournament that was played, for the 20th time, from November 24 to November 26, 2003.  The tournament began in 1984, and was part of the 2003–04 NCAA Division I men's basketball season.  The tournament was played at the Lahaina Civic Center in Maui, Hawaii from November 24 to 26,.

Bracket

References

Maui Invitational Tournament
Maui Invitational
Maui